Oshita, Ōshita, Ooshita or Ohshita (written: 大下) is a Japanese surname. Notable people with the surname include:

Gerald Oshita (1942–1992), American musician, composer, and sound recordist
, Japanese baseball player and manager
Rod Oshita (born 1959), American handball player
, Japanese water polo player

Japanese-language surnames